The following is a list of programs broadcast by the defunct Audience network, formerly known as Freeview and The 101 Network.

Original programming

Drama

Comedy

Anthology

Continuations

Docuseries

Documentaries

Talk shows

Acquired programming
Alfred Hitchcock Presents
American Gothic
Brotherhood
Call Me Fitz
Castle
The Closer
The Dan Patrick Show
Deadwood
Friday the 13th: The Series
General Hospital: Night Shift
Hit & Miss
How Not to Live Your Life
Law & Order: Special Victims Unit 
Less Than Kind
Mad Men
Major Crimes 
Monsters
Mutual Friends
Night Gallery
The Nine
No Heroics
Odyssey: Driving Around the World
Oz
Rake
The Rich Eisen Show
The Shadow Line
The Slap
Sleeper Cell
Smith
Sons of Anarchy
Tales from the Crypt
Trailer Park Boys
Twin Peaks
Underbelly
Weeds
The Wire
Wonderland

References

Notes

Audience (TV network) original programming
Audience